The TEDxSantaCruz is an independent TEDx event founded in 2011 by David Warren, a retired Cabrillo College Professor. This initiative is independently organized by a group of entrepreneurs, artists, philanthropists, and educators called the  TEDxSanta Cruz Leadership Team. The curator and organizers of these past events have been led by Jon Luini, Nada Miljkovic, Kirsti Scott and Irene Tsouprake according to TED Other team members have been Doug Abrams, Mary Anderson, Vania Benavides, Elizabeth Gummere Gary Maricich, Cheri O'Neil, Sheila Schat, Mariah Tanner, Dag Weiser.

The TEDxSantaCruz YouTube Channel is had over 2.3 million views at last tally.  Their last event had seven TEDxSantaCruz talks go on the TED Channel. Those include: Roxanne Beltran, How Learning in Nature Helps Diverse Students Succeed, Ryan Coonerty, Local Government: Where Democracy Goes to Live, David Deamer, The Arc of the Scientific Universe is Long..., Sylvanna Falcon, The Ingrediants of Activism, Jonathan Franzen, Save What You Love, Barry Sinervo, Climate Cancer Crisis, An Allegorical Tale Other notable TEDxSantaCruz talks are: Dr. Paul A. Lee, The Greeks had a Word for it, Thymos

Past Events 

 2011 "Engage"
 2012 "Open"
 2014 "Activate"
 2015 "Radical Collaboration"  
 2019 "The Art of Hope"

References

External links
 TEdxSantaCruz

Santa Cruz, California
Santa Cruz